Sulcospira circumstriata is a species of freshwater snail with an operculum, an aquatic gastropod mollusk in the family Pachychilidae.

Distribution 
This species occurs in:
 Malaysia

References

External links 
 

Pachychilidae
Gastropods described in 1851
Taxobox binomials not recognized by IUCN